The North Grand Island Bridge is a pair of twin two-lane truss arch bridges spanning the Niagara River between Grand Island and Niagara Falls in New York, United States. Each bridge carries one direction of Interstate 190 (I-190). Both crossings are operated by the New York State Thruway Authority as part of the Niagara Thruway. The northbound span opened in 1935; the southbound span was finished in 1965.

A southbound-only toll is presently collected via open-road cashless tolling. The open-road tolling began operating on March 29, 2018, replacing conventional toll booths which were on Grand Island  
 The tollbooths were dismantled, and drivers are no longer able to pay cash at the bridge. Instead, drivers will travel beneath an overhead gantry where their E-ZPass transponder will be detected and charged. Drivers without an  E-ZPass will have a picture of their license plate taken, and the toll will be mailed to them.

References

External links
  Pictures taken of North Grand Island Bridges taken 8-3-07
 Highlights of the History of Grand Island, NY

Bridges in Niagara Falls, New York
Bridges completed in 1935
Bridges completed in 1965
Toll bridges in New York (state)
New York State Thruway Authority
Bridges over the Niagara River
Road bridges in New York (state)
Truss bridges in the United States
Metal bridges in the United States